The Obama coalition was the combination of various voting blocs that supported the candidacy and presidency of Barack Obama. It consisted primarily of racial minorities, along with women and young voters. It allowed for high vote share among cities and suburbs, as well as among voters that self-described as moderate. The coalition formed in 2007 and 2008 as Obama campaigned for the presidency. During the 2008 election, the strength of the coalition gave Obama 53% of the vote, making him the first Democrat to win with a popular vote majority since Jimmy Carter in 1976. In 2012, he won reelection with 51% of the vote along similar demographic lines.

The weaknesses of the coalition became apparent during the two midterm elections that took place during Obama's presidency. During the 2010 midterms, significant portions of the coalition failed to turn out or defected to the Republican Party. Similar results occurred in the 2014 midterms. Hillary Clinton was described as attempting to continue the Obama coalition in order to win the presidential election in 2016, with her loss marking the end of the coalition.

During the 2020 Democratic Party presidential debates, Kamala Harris argued that it was necessary to "rebuild the Obama coalition" for the Democratic Party to win the election. After receiving the Democratic nomination, Obama's former Vice President Joe Biden was described as requiring a new coalition due to shifts in voting patterns over the previous years; the white working-class had moved away from the coalition while women aligned with it in stronger numbers. Slight shifts had also taken place among suburban and nonwhite voters. In 2020,  Joe Biden won the presidential election with the same voting blocs as the Obama coalition.

Vote share

See also 

 History of the Democratic Party (United States)
 New Deal coalition
 Reagan coalition
 Sixth Party System

References 

Democratic Party (United States)
Liberalism in the United States
Political history of the United States
Presidency of Barack Obama